Gerardo Lopez may refer to:

Gerardo I. Lopez, CEO and President, AMC Theatres
Gerry Lopez (born 1948), American surfer, shaper, journalist, and film actor
Gerardo López Villaseñor